NYR: New York Race, also known as New York Race, is a science fiction racing game based on the film The Fifth Element directed by Luc Besson released in 2001. Many of the characters from the film are playable, including characters that did not have a significant role in the film, and lacked names.

Gameplay

The player may choose between 25 unlockable vehicles, each with their own unique advantages and disadvantages, which fit into three categories:
Speeders have good acceleration but weak shields.
Hovercars are general 'all round' vehicles.
Cruisers are very slow, but have extremely good shielding.

In the game, New York is set not only to be large horizontally, it is also set to be large vertically for the city is several miles high as well as a few miles wide.
Within the game, There are also 12 different courses around New York City, each being grouped into one of the four district groups which are:

Middle Class: Set in the middle parts of New York, fairly lively with middle class businesses and fairly bright.
Jet Set: Around the top of New York's very high towers bearing beautiful aesthetics, being quite lively and really bright.
The Slums: The base of New York's great towers, they consist of dirty areas such as Sewers or Dumps, they are very dark and foggy and hardly any traffic ever goes in the areas of this district group.
Chinatown: The Chinese district group of the city, bearing lively streets, very beautiful aesthetics and contains some parts of slight darkness and fair brightness.

Reception
Eurogamer gave the game 6 out of 10.

References

External links
NYR: New York Race on IGN
Read product information for NYR: New York Race
New York Race - Das fünfte Element Cheats (PS2)

2001 video games
Game Boy Color games
PlayStation 2 games
Science fiction racing games
Racing video games set in the United States
Video games based on films
Video games developed in France
Video games set in New York City
Video games set in the 23rd century
Windows games
Cyberpunk video games